Ditholong is a village established in the late 1970s as an extension of Letebejane Village. The name means Place of the African Antelope.

This village lies along the Flag Boshielo Dam (formerly known as Arabie Dam). The village is under the chieftaincy of Chief Rakgoadi Matlala, who is the local chief based at Ga-Matlala'a Rakgoadi in Mohlalaotoane.

Economy 
Economic movement is very slow in this small village and residents normally move to the more economically vibrant cities (Predominantly in Gauteng) to seek greener pastures. Seroka Consulting, which is founded and owned by a local engineer who is also a community development stalwart, in a joint venture with Gudani has conducted a feasibility study on tourism development in Schuinsdraai Nature Reserve and the adjacent villages in the eastern side of the dam for Sekhukhune Development Agency in 2011/12 financial year. Schuinsdraai Nature Reserve is located in the western side of Flag Boshielo Dam which forms a boundary with villages in the eastern side, viz. Letebejane/ Ditholong villages in the north and Makgatle (Ga Makharankhane) village in the south. The main goal of the feasibility study was to give Sekhukhune Development Agency and its development partners (Ephraim Mogale Local Municipality, Limpopo Tourism Board and communities adjacent to the dam site) sufficient confidence to make informed decisions about potential for private investment in the project. Using primary and secondary data, the study team looked at (1) whether the institutional and regulatory environment was supportive; (2) whether the proposed project site was suitable for development of the proposed tourism attraction facilities (considering access to civil engineering services and environmental sensitivities); (3) whether there is an sustainable market for the proposed tourist attraction facilities; and (4) whether the proposed development is financial viable with potential to attract private investors.

The assessment of the strategies, policies and plans of regulating authorities indicated a positive outlook on tourism in the Schuinsdraai/ Flag Boshielo Precinct. Ecotourism is a growing segment with an increasing attraction of international, national and local visitors.

Water
The villagers have always struggled with water resources until the Arabie water project was established a few years ago. All residents now have access to clean tap water in their yards.

Education 
The local school is Kotole High school, and despite a lack of resources it has produced a few professionals, including engineers and software developers. Most of these young professionals are based in Pretoria and they keep a very close bond, as evidenced by their frequent get-together in the big city or in the village for special occasions.

Entertainment 
For fun, the villagers go to a local Lulu bar lounge and Mahlako Liquor Restaurant for drinks. Mahlako Liquor Restaurant has created a vibe and entertainment in the area since its resurfacing in May 2013 and has since hosted hot gigs including Checho ke Checho and Capricorn FM's first 2014 Mahala Party on Valentines weekend, giving the local dj's a platform to share the stage with their favorite national dj's. Otherwise there are other smaller places at which locals hang out to have their entertainment such as Peipei's Morithi Tavern to mention few. This places change frequently because there are quite a few of them and the competition means that the businesses have a low turnover because usually the locals frequent the 'flavour of the month', after which the place closes down to be replaced by a similar venture elsewhere.

In festive season the villagers indulge in a local home brew cider called Morula. This brew is alcoholic and is very popular amongst the older males, but a few cash strapped young men have been known to quench their thirst by buying this affordable brew.

The village has recently seen the innovation or creation called Checho ke Checho. It’s a party movement that has taken the village by storm and has grown into this thick phenomen that every young aspirant wants to follow. 
Checho Ke Checho in partnership with Mahlako Liquor Restaurant supported by Seroka Consulting hosts 4-5 events a year that brings an urban flair into the villages. Such events include but not limited to fun runs, soccer tournaments, music and beauty contests. The young and aspirant architects of Checho Ke Checho are currently pioneering the "Adopt a child" campaign focusing on reaching out the most needy and less fortunate local children for educational support in particular as a means of integrating fun and education.

As if that is not enough, another local youth group has come up with music entertainment related concept in the name of Lebowa Entertainment and has since brought it some entertainers from outside the village. Ditholong village has without any doubt become the Ga Rakgoadi centre of entertainment.

Crime 
Crime is a major problem for local businesses. This includes shops and local spaza shops. This has seen a few businesses close down as a result of being broken into and ransacked, or having robberies take place at gun point. This has only made the migration to the big cities to increase.

References

Populated places in the Ephraim Mogale Local Municipality